Sai Tarn Hua Jai is Thai television melodrama, based on novel of the same name which was written by Wassana. Aired the first time in 2000 via Channel 7.

Aired through Channel 3 on every Wednesday–Thursday, 20.20–22.50 (UTC+07.00) since November 1 – December 6, 2017. After that, it reruned on every Monday–Friday at 11.45–13.45 (TST) started on July 18 – August 6, 2019.

Plot 
Narang an orphan who was adopted by M.C. Manthep Jongsawas as the palace's inhabitant. He was raised by Prakeong, the old servant and a minor wife of M.C. Manthep. Prakeong also has a daughter with Manthep, Lamun, whom Narang loves like a real sister. But she secretly crush on him.

M.C. Patawee Jongsawas, the only daughter of M.C. Manthep who is the pride of him. She and Narang used to have a good feeling for each others. But M.C. Manthep never accepted Narang, so he send him to study abroad.  When Narang is back, he found that Jongsawas is in debt and the hotel of the family, The Grand Royal, is also has a problem. Narang decided to save the hotel for paying an owes of favor with M.C. Manthep. As a result, he meets Sirikanya again. She applies in the hotel as a secretary of the stockholder. Sirikanya is brave, but poor, and living with her grandmother.

Kiattisak, the creditor of M.C. Manthep, forcing M.R. Patawee marry to him for paying an owe. She refused because she never forget Narang and keep eliminating the women who are close to him, especially Sirikanya. It makes Kiattisak knows that M.R. Patawee loves Narang, so he started to attack him and everyone who dissatisfy M.R. Patawee.

Prakeong doses everything to makes Lamun gets the rights that she should receive as one of M.C. Manthep's daughters. And also supported the marry between Lamun and Narang because he is the only man that she trusted. While, Teacher Sawad, who is the colleague of Lamun, has a crush on her secretly, always being on her side and being an consultant for her.

Cast

Original soundtracks

2017

Ratings 
 — the number of the highest rating
 — the number of the lowest rating

References 

Channel 3 (Thailand) original programming
2017 Thai television series debuts
2017 Thai television series endings
Thai television soap operas